A list of animated television series first aired in 1971.

See also
 List of animated feature films of 1971
 List of Japanese animation television series of 1971

References

Television series
Animated series
1971
1971
1971-related lists